Thomas Brinkmann (born 1959) is a German producer of experimental minimal techno music. He began experimenting with records in the early eighties and released re-workings of material by fellow artists Mike Ink and Richie Hawtin in the second half of the 1990s. These productions were made by playing physically modified vinyl records on highly customized turntables with an additional tone arm.

Brinkmann later founded the Ernst record label and introduced his own productions on a series of 12" records taking their titles from female names. He has also produced for labels such as Traum Schallplatten, Raster-Noton and Mute Records (under the Soul Center alias). In 2010, he contributed a cover of Suicide's song "Diamonds, Furcoats, Champagne" for the Alan Vega 70th Birthday Limited Edition EP Series. In 2017, he performed his collaboration with Derek Piotr "Absolute Grey", at ISSUE Project Room in NYC. In 2018, he contributed the piece "Wiener" to Stephan Mathieu's SCALE project.

Thomas Brinkmann’s tracks Olga Al and Sym feature on the soundtrack of the film John & Jane by Ashim Ahluwalia.

References

External links 
 Official Site
 Discogs: Thomas Brinkmann
 Resident Advisor: Thomas Brinkmann
 Discography at Wolf's Kompaktkiste
 Klick Revolution album review
 Review of Tokyo + 1 at Grooves Magazine

1959 births
German techno musicians
Living people